Vanessa Hill (born 3 March 1987) is an Australian television presenter, producer and science communicator, who is best known for her YouTube series BrainCraft. Hill has hosted a PBS series of the same name since 2014.

Early life and education 
Hill was born in Sydney, Australia and developed her interest in science while walking dingoes around Taronga Zoo. In 2008, Hill graduated from the University of New South Wales with a Bachelor of Science and then completed a Master of Science Communication at the Australian National University.

Career 
In 2008 Hill began working for CSIRO, a federal government agency for scientific research as an educator. In 2013 she won the CSIRO medal for excellence and hosted a series on DIY Experiments for the agency.

In 2014, Hill was hired by PBS after presenting her idea for BrainCraft as a stop-motion science series. She further collaborated with PBS and Screen Australia in 2017 to direct and host Mutant Menu, a global exploration of new gene editing technology that was PBS Digital Studio's first long-form documentary, and in 2018 for Attention Wars, an online exploration of the behavioral psychology behind social media.

Hill is a host of the ABC series Sciencey and appears as a regular guest on ABC Radio, Dear Hank & John, DNews and SciShow.

In 2019, Hill was announced as a AAAS Women in STEM ambassador.

YouTube 
Hill created her YouTube channel BrainCraft in 2014 has 600,000 subscribers. BrainCraft is part of the PBS Digital Studios network. Her videos address phenomena related to memory, sleep, brain hacks, and the science of food.

Hill has been outspoken about the hateful comments directed towards women on YouTube. In 2018, Hill was featured in New York Times and Washington Post reports about new research that found women on YouTube receive a higher proportion of critical comments about their appearances. She also hosted the Crash Course Public Health series on YouTube.

References 

1987 births
Science communicators
Living people
Australian television personalities
Women television personalities
Australian YouTubers